Charles Maximilien, Count de Lalaing (1856–1919) was a Belgian diplomat.

Family 
De Lalaing was born in London, but belonged to the Belgian Lalaing family; his father was count Maximilien III de Lalaing (1811–1881) and his brother, Jacques, became a celebrated artist. He was married to Christine du Tour van Bellinchave (1886–1919), daughter of Marc Willem du Tour van Bellinchave. Their son, Jacques III de Lalaing (1889–1969), followed the career of his father.

Career 
De Lalaing was an ambassador to Switzerland (1899–1903), Romania (1896–1899) and Brasil (1893–1896). He was sent to the coronation of King George V. He served in the United Kingdom from 1904 to 1917, during the First World war. He died after a long illness and was buried in an Anglican service in Brussels.

Honours 
 : 
Commander of the Order of Leopold.
Knight Grand cross in the Order of the Crown
Commemorative Medal of the Reign of King Leopold II
 :  
 Knight grand Cross in the Royal Victorian Order
 George V Coronation medal
 : Knight grand Cross in the Order of the Crown of Italy
 : Knight grand Cross in the Order of the Star of Romania
 Officer of the Imperial Order of the Rising Sun
 Knight of the Order of the Netherlands Lion

References 

Charles
Ambassadors of Belgium to Switzerland
Ambassadors of Belgium to the United Kingdom
Knights Grand Cross of the Royal Victorian Order
Grand Crosses of the Order of the Crown (Belgium)
Recipients of the Order of the Rising Sun
Knights of the Order of the Netherlands Lion